(kyūjitai: 鍋島榮子) (1855–1941) was a feature of Japanese high society from the Meiji period to the early Shōwa era. Daughter of kuge Hirohashi Taneyasu, in April 1881 she married Nabeshima Naohiro, eleventh and final daimyō of the Saga Domain, in Italy, where he was performing official duties.

See also

 Seiyōkan (Nabeshima residence)
 Chōkokan

References

Nabeshima clan
1855 births
1941 deaths
People from Kyoto